Provincial Trunk Highway 28 (PTH 28) was a short provincial highway in the Canadian province of Manitoba.

The highway was used as a connector to PTH 3 and PR 258 at Cartwright and the U.S. border, where it continued as SR 69 in North Dakota (later redesignated as SR 4 in 1997).

History
PTH 28 first appeared on the 1959 Manitoba Highway Map. Along with PR 258, PTH 28 was decommissioned in its entirety when PTH 5 was extended from Neepawa to its current southern terminus in 1980.

The original PTH 28 was designated from PTH 1 north of Griswold to PTH 4 in Shoal Lake. This became part of PTH 21 in 1949.

See also
Manitoba Highway 5

References

028